The 2002/03 FIS Freestyle Skiing World Cup was the twenty fourth World Cup season in freestyle skiing organised by International Ski Federation. The season started on 7 September 2002 and ended on 12 March 2003. This season included four disciplines: aerials, moguls, dual moguls and ski cross. 

In this season new discipline skicross was for first time introduced in the World Cup. This season dual moguls counted as season title and was awarded with small crystal globe separately from moguls for the last time. From next season on dual moguls became one with moguls ranking, title and its small crystal globe.

Men

Moguls

Aerials

Ski Cross

Ladies

Moguls

Aerials

Ski Cross

Men's standings

Overall 

Standings after 25 races.

Moguls 

Standings after 10 races.

Aerials 

Standings after 9 races.

Ski Cross 

Standings after 3 races.

Dual moguls 

Standings after 3 races.

Ladies' standings

Overall 

Standings after 25 races.

Moguls 

Standings after 10 races.

Aerials 

Standings after 9 races.

Ski Cross 

Standings after 3 races.

Dual moguls 

Standings after 3 races.

Nations Cup

Overall 

Standings after 50 races.

Men 

Standings after 25 races.

Ladies 

Standings after 25 races.

References

External links

FIS Freestyle Skiing World Cup
World Cup
World Cup